Ryan Jennings (born 8 July 1995) is an English footballer who plays as a midfielder for Ramsbottom United.

He began his career in the Football League with Wigan Athletic where he spent spells on loan with Accrington Stanley, Cheltenham Town and Grimsby Town. Since his release by Wigan in 2016 he has turned out for both AFC Fylde and Curzon Ashton.

Career
Jennings began his career with his hometown club Stockport County and joined Wigan Athletic in 2012. He went on loan at Accrington Stanley in March 2015 but failed to make an appearance for Stanley through injury. He made his professional debut on 11 August 2015 in a 2–1 League Cup defeat against Bury. On 12 November 2015, Jennings joined National League side Cheltenham Town on an initial one-month loan deal.

On 15 February 2016, Jennings joined National League side Grimsby Town on loan until the end of the season. Jennings was part of the team that eventually went on to beat Forest Green Rovers 3–1 in the 2016 National League play-off Final at Wembley, seeing Grimsby promoted to League Two after a six-year absence from the Football League.

In September 2016 Jennings joined National League North side AFC Fylde, but by December he had joined local league rivals Curzon Ashton. On 15 June 2017 he penned a one-year deal with Alfreton Town. During his time at Alfreton he received a call up for England C as back up but never made an appearance .

In July 2022, Jennings joined Northern Premier League Division One West club Ramsbottom United following a spell with Widnes FC.

Career statistics

References

External links

1995 births
Living people
People from Gorton
Footballers from Manchester
English footballers
Association football wingers
Stockport County F.C. players
Wigan Athletic F.C. players
Accrington Stanley F.C. players
Curzon Ashton F.C. players
Grimsby Town F.C. players
Cheltenham Town F.C. players
AFC Fylde players
Alfreton Town F.C. players
Nuneaton Borough F.C. players
Ashton United F.C. players
Buxton F.C. players
Widnes F.C. players
Ramsbottom United F.C. players
English Football League players
National League (English football) players
Northern Premier League players